A referendum to determine if former presidents can be prosecuted for corruption was held in Mexico on 1 August 2021.

The referendum was proposed by incumbent President Andrés Manuel López Obrador in 2020.

Criticism
The referendum cost Mex$528 million—US$25 million. The referendum was criticized by journalists as pointless, since ex-presidents can be prosecuted for any crime just as any other person. According to López Obrador, ex-presidents cannot be judged because of Article 108 of the Constitution of Mexico, and it needs to be reworded. The article says: "The President of the Republic, during his term of office, may be impeached only for treason to the country and serious common crimes."

Prior to the referendum, Luis Echeverría, president from 1970 to 1976, has been the only former officeholder to be judged, being charged with genocide. In 2006, he pleaded guilty for his involvement in the 1968 Tlatelolco massacre and the 1971 Corpus Christi massacre. By 2009, he was exonerated from the accusations.

Results 
The referendum received 6,663,208 votes, with a turnout of 7.11%. In order to be a binding referendum, it required a turnout of 40% of registered voters, approximately 37 million votes.

See also 
 2021 in Mexico

References 

Mexico
2021 in Mexico
Referendums in Mexico
2021 in Mexican politics